(Decius) Paulinus (floruit 534) was a Roman aristocrat and politician who served as the last consul of the Roman Senate. After his term, consuls would be appointed in the East alone.

Family
Paulinus was a member of the Decia gens, the son of Basilius Venantius (consul in 508), and the brother of Decius (consul in 529). Paulinus had at least one other brother who was appointed to the consulate.

Consulate
In September 533, Paulinus became the last consul to be designated by a barbarian king, Athalaric. He started his term in January 534, alongside the Eastern emperor Justinian I (r. 527–565).

References

Further reading 

6th-century Byzantine people
6th-century Italo-Roman people
6th-century Roman consuls
Imperial Roman consuls
Paulinus